Tigemonam is a monobactam antibiotic.

References

Monobactam antibiotics
Thiazoles
Sulfonic acids